Laurie Jack Niemi (March 19, 1925 – February 19, 1968) was an American and Canadian football offensive and defensive tackle in the National Football League for the Washington Redskins and in the Canadian Football League for the BC Lions. After his playing days, he was an assistant coach at the collegiate and professional levels.

Born in Red Lodge, Montana, Niemi was of Finnish heritage. He moved with his family in 1932 to Clarkston, Washington, and graduated from its high school in 1943. He played college football at Washington State College in Pullman, was an All-American, and the eighteenth selection of the 1949 NFL Draft, taken in the second round by the Redskins.

Later an assistant coach at his alma mater under Jim Sutherland and Bert Clark, Niemi was retained on staff by new head coach Jim Sweeney in early 1968. He had battled cancer for twelve years and died that February at age 42 at Spokane's Sacred Heart Hospital. He previously coached at the University of Montana and for the NFL's Philadelphia Eagles. Hundreds attended his memorial service at WSU's Bohler Gymnasium in Pullman.

References

External links
Just Sports Stats

1925 births
1968 deaths
American people of Finnish descent
American football offensive tackles
Canadian football offensive linemen
American players of Canadian football
Eastern Conference Pro Bowl players
Washington Redskins players
BC Lions players
Washington State Cougars football players
Players of American football from Washington (state)
Players of American football from Montana
People from Red Lodge, Montana
People from Clarkston, Washington
Washington State Cougars football coaches
Montana Grizzlies football coaches
Philadelphia Eagles coaches